Pushkar Shivkumar Sharma is an Indian-born Kenyan Cricketer. He made his debut on Nov 17, 2022 against Saint Helena at the age of 22, a year after scoring 841 runs from 14 innings in the NPCA (Nairobi Province Cricket Association) Super Division League. He opened the batting for Kenya in the 2022-23 ICC Men's T20 World Cup Africa Qualifiers alongside Collins Obuya. He led Mumbai Under-16 team in 2014-15, where Prithvi Shaw played under his captaincy.

References

External links 
 
 Pushkar Sharma  at Cricbuzz

Kenya Twenty20 International cricketers
Kenyan cricketers
Living people
2000 births